Moh Siew Wei (Pha̍k-fa-sṳ: Mo̍k Hiáu-vì;  born 30 April 1978 in Ipoh) is a retired Malaysian athlete who specialised in the 100 metres hurdles. She won several medals at the regional level.

She has personal bests of 13.27 seconds in the 100 metres hurdles (Kassel 2004) and 8.38 seconds in the 60 metres hurdles (Karlsruhe 2005). Both are current national records.

She retired from competition in 2008 and married a former pole vaulter, Teh Weng Chang, the same year.

Competition record

References

1978 births
Living people
Malaysian female hurdlers
Malaysian people of Chinese descent
Athletes (track and field) at the 2002 Asian Games
Athletes (track and field) at the 2006 Commonwealth Games
Southeast Asian Games medalists in athletics
People from Ipoh
Southeast Asian Games gold medalists for Malaysia
Southeast Asian Games silver medalists for Malaysia
Southeast Asian Games bronze medalists for Malaysia
Competitors at the 2001 Southeast Asian Games
Competitors at the 2003 Southeast Asian Games
Competitors at the 2005 Southeast Asian Games
Competitors at the 2007 Southeast Asian Games
Asian Games competitors for Malaysia
Commonwealth Games competitors for Malaysia